A referendum on a trade initiative was held in Liechtenstein on 20 December 1964. The proposal was rejected by 62.5% of voters.

Results

References

1964 referendums
1964 in Liechtenstein
Referendums in Liechtenstein
December 1964 events in Europe